Mehdi Hajizadeh Jooybari (born 11 September 1981 in Jooybar) is an Iranian wrestler.

He is freestyle wrestler who competed for Iran at the 2002 World Championships in Tehran. He was considered an inexperienced twenty one year old underdog going into the 2002 Iranian World Qualifiers but was successful beating a more experienced and successful wrestler. The Iranian Wrestling Federation had Hajizadeh wrestle the favourite again and he beat him once more earning a berth to compete for Iran in the World Championships at home. The young Hajizadeh continued his strong wrestling as he went undefeated to dominantly win the 2002 World Championship title and also earned the award as the top wrestler in the tournament.

References

External links
 

1981 births
Living people
Iranian male sport wrestlers
Wrestlers at the 2004 Summer Olympics
Olympic wrestlers of Iran
Asian Games bronze medalists for Iran
Asian Games medalists in wrestling
Wrestlers at the 2002 Asian Games
World Wrestling Champions
Medalists at the 2002 Asian Games
People from Juybar
Asian Wrestling Championships medalists
Sportspeople from Mazandaran province
20th-century Iranian people
21st-century Iranian people